Vergueiro may refer to:

Maria Alice Vergueiro (1935–2020), Brazilian actress
Vergueiro, an underground station in São Paulo, Brazil
Mauser-Vergueiro, Portuguese bolt-action rifle
Nicolau Vergueiro, municipality in Rio Grande do Sul, Brazil